The R512 road is a regional road in Ireland which runs from Limerick City to Fermoy, County Cork. At one time it was part of the main route between the cities of Limerick and Cork.

See also
Roads in Ireland
National primary road
National secondary road

References
Roads Act 1993 (Classification of Regional Roads) Order 2006 – Department of Transport

Regional roads in the Republic of Ireland
Roads in County Limerick
Roads in County Cork